Charles Bertin (1919–2002) was a Belgian poet.

1919 births
2002 deaths
Belgian male poets
Belgian poets in French
People from Mons
Walloon movement activists
Walloon people
20th-century Belgian poets
20th-century Belgian male writers
20th-century Belgian dramatists and playwrights
Belgian male dramatists and playwrights